The Indoor Cricket World Cup is the premier international championship of both men's and women's Indoor Cricket. The event is organised by the sport's governing body, the World Indoor Cricket Federation (WICF) and is held every two or three years. The first Indoor Cricket World Cup contest was organised in England in 1995. Separate world championships are held for both junior and masters age groups with the Junior World Series of Indoor Cricket and the Masters World Series of Indoor Cricket held at similar intervals.

The World Cup is contested by the members of the WICF (though member nations have not always entered teams) and beyond being an affiliated member of that body there are no formal qualifications for entry. Australia have been the most successful side having won every world title in both divisions to date.

The 2017 Indoor Cricket World Cup was held in Dubai in United Arab Emirates, with Insportz Club serving as the host venue.

Tournament Format
Whilst the precise nature of the tournament has varied slightly over the years, each tournament usually follows a simple round robin format followed by finals contested by the highest placed sides. The semi finals are contested by the top four sides.

The tournament usually takes place over the course of 7 to 10 days and is sometimes run in conjunction with the Masters World Series or the Junior World Series.

Results

See also
Junior World Series of Indoor Cricket
Masters World Series of Indoor Cricket

References

 
Indoor cricket
World championships in cricket
World cups
Recurring sporting events established in 1995